This article lists the Ministers of Foreign Affairs of Austria, from 30 October 1918 up to today. During the time of the Anschluss to Nazi Germany from 1938 to 1945, Austria had no government in its own right. The current Austrian Foreign Minister is Alexander Schallenberg, who took office on 6 December 2021.

List of officeholders (1918–present)

Foreign Ministers of Austria during the Interwar period

Austria annexed by Nazi Germany in 1938 (see Austria under National Socialism for details). Independence restored in 1945.

Foreign Ministers of Austria after the end of World War II

See also
Foreign relations of Austria
List of diplomatic missions of Austria
List of foreign ministers of Austria-Hungary

References

 
Lists of government ministers of Austria